Debasis Chakraborty (born 28 December 1958) is an Indian former cricketer. He played three first-class matches for Bengal in 1984/85.

See also
 List of Bengal cricketers

References

External links
 

1958 births
Living people
Indian cricketers
Bengal cricketers
Cricketers from Kolkata